The modulation index (or modulation depth) of a modulation scheme describes by how much the modulated variable of the carrier signal varies around its unmodulated level. It is defined differently in each modulation scheme.

Amplitude modulation index
Frequency modulation index
Phase modulation index